Amy Zegart (born 1967) is an American academic. She is the Morris Arnold and Nona Jean Cox Senior Fellow at the Hoover Institution. She is also a senior fellow at the Freeman Spogli Institute of International Studies (FSI), professor of political science (by courtesy) at Stanford University, and a contributing writer to The Atlantic. From 2013 to 2018, she served as co-director of the Freeman Spogli Institute’s Center for International Security and Cooperation (CISAC) and founder and co-director of the Stanford Cyber Policy Program.

Early life
Zegart was born in Louisville, Kentucky, in 1967. She received an A.B. in East Asian Studies magna cum laude from Harvard University. She then earned a Ph.D in Political Science at Stanford University, where she studied under Condoleezza Rice. While in graduate school, she spent time on President Bill Clinton's National Security Council staff.

Career
Shortly after graduating from Harvard, Zegart moved to Hong Kong, where she continued studying East Asia for a year on a Fulbright Scholarship. Following this, she began work as an associate with McKinsey & Company, where she advised Fortune 100 companies on strategy and organizational effectiveness. Zegart then attended graduate school. After completing her Ph.D., she served as professor of public policy at the UCLA Luskin School of Public Affairs and as a fellow at the Burkle Center for International Relations. In 2011, Zegart moved to Stanford University.

Zegart is a leading national expert on the United States Intelligence Community and national security policy. She has written four books on the topic: Flawed By Design, which chronicled the evolution of the relationship between the United States Department of Defense, the Central Intelligence Agency, and the National Security Council; Spying Blind, which examined U.S. intelligence agencies in the period preceding the September 11 attacks in 2001; Eyes on Spies, which examined the weaknesses of U.S. intelligence oversight; and Spies, Lies, and Algorithms, which examined espionage in the digital age.

Zegart currently serves as a member of the board of directors of Kratos Defense & Security Solutions, a military contractor and weapons manufacturer that received a $29m government contract in 2016 to produce directed-energy weapon systems.

She currently resides in Palo Alto, California, and is married to a retired screenwriter.

Publications
 Flawed by Design: The Evolution of the CIA, JCS, and NSC, Stanford University Press, 1999. 
 Spying Blind: The CIA, the FBI, and the Origins of 9/11, Princeton University Press, 2007. 
 Eyes on Spies: Congress and the United States Intelligence Community, Hoover Institution Press, 2011. 

 "Spies, Lies, and Algorithms," Foreign Affairs, May/June 2019.

 "Intelligence Isn't Just for Governments Anymore," Foreign Affairs, November 2020.
 "Spies Like Us," Foreign Affairs, July/August 2021.
 Spies, Lies, and Algorithms: The History and Future of American Intelligence, Princeton University Press, 2022.

References

External links

 Amy Zegart Biography. The New York Times. Accessed June 2012.
 Interview: Professor Amy Zegart, "Flawed by Design", discusses the future of the CIA – NPR Weekend Edition

Living people
1967 births
Harvard College alumni
Stanford University alumni
UCLA Luskin School of Public Affairs faculty
Hoover Institution people
People from Louisville, Kentucky